The 2013–14 Ascenso MX season took place from 19 July 2013 to 12 April 2014 and was divided into two tournaments named Apertura 2013 and Clausura 2014.  The Ascenso MX is the second-tier football league of Mexico.

Changes from the previous season

 C.F. La Piedad were promoted to Liga MX. But rebranded Tiburones Rojos de Veracruz and Moved to Veracruz.
 Querétaro F.C. were relegated from Liga MX. But was able to purchase a Liga MX franchise and stay in 1st Division, Querétaro's Ascenso MX Team disappeared. 
 Tiburones Rojos de Veracruz were rebranded Atlético San Luis and Moved to San Luis Potosí, San Luis Potosí.
 Irapuato FC was rebranded Zacatepec and moved to Zacatepec de Hidalgo, Morelos.
 Toros Neza was rebranded Delfines F.C. and moved to Ciudad del Carmen, Campeche.
 Tecamachalco was promoted from Segunda División de México rebranded Alebrijes de Oaxaca and moved to Oaxaca, Oaxaca.
 Club de Futbol Ballenas Galeana Morelos were promoted from Segunda División de México.
 Pumas Morelos were relegated to Segunda División de México, the team disappeared after the relegation.

Stadia and locations

The following 15 clubs competed in the Liga de Ascenso during the 2013–2014 season:

Torneo Apertura
The 2013 Apertura was the first championship of the season. It began on 19 July 2013 and ended on 30 November 2013.

Standings

Results

Liguilla (Playoffs)

The six best teams after first place played two games against each other on a home-and-away basis. The winner of each match up was determined by aggregate score. If the teams were tied, the Away goals rule applied.

The teams were seeded one to seven in quarterfinals, and were re-seeded one to four in semifinals, depending on their position in the general table. The higher seeded teams play on their home field during the second leg.

 If the two teams were tied after both legs, the away goals rule applied. If both teams were still tied, the higher seeded team advanced.
 Teams were re-seeded every round.
 The winner qualified to the playoff match vs the Clausura 2014 winner. However, if the winner had been the same in both tournaments, that team would have been the team promoted to the 2014–15 Mexican Primera División season without playing the Promotional Final

Quarterfinals

First leg

Second leg

Semifinals

First leg

Second leg

Final

First leg

Second leg

Torneo Clausura

Standings

Results

Liguilla (Playoffs)
The six best teams after the first place played two games against each other on a home-and-away basis. The winner was determined by aggregate score. If the teams were tied, the Away goals rule applied.

The teams were seeded one to seven in quarterfinals, and were re-seeded one to four in semifinals, depending on their position in the general table. The higher seeded teams played on their home field during the second leg.

 If the two teams were tied after both legs, the away goals rule applied. If both teams were still tied, higher seeded team advanced.
 Teams were re-seeded every round.
 The winner qualified to the playoff match vs UdeG (Apertura 2013 Champions). The winner was promoted to the 2014–15 Mexican Primera División season.

Quarterfinals

First leg

Second leg

Semifinals

First leg

Second leg

Final

First leg

Second leg

Promotional final

First Leg

Second leg

Relegation table 
The relegated team will be the team with the lowest ratio by summing the points scored in the following tournaments: Apertura 2011, Clausura 2012, Apertura 2012, Clausura 2013, Apertura 2013 and Clausura 2014.

References

External links
Liga MX & Ascenso MX Official Website

2013-14